The Home Savings Bank Building is an office building located in downtown Albany, New York, United States at 11 North Pearl Street (NY 32).

Description
When it was completed in 1927, the Home Savings Bank Building was the tallest structure in Albany. However, the Alfred E. Smith Building surpassed it the following year. That building has since been surpassed by the Erastus Corning Tower, which since its construction in 1973 has held the title of Albany's tallest building.  Nevertheless, the Home Savings Bank Building has remained the tallest private building in Albany since its construction.

The building features unusual stylized Art Deco images of Native Americans and colonial settlers near its roof and ground-floor street entrance. The artwork of unique decorative metal and terra cotta is by Rene Paul Chambellan. Also of architectural note is the original street-level banking floor with its various historic seals, rich marble walls and incredibly high ceilings. In recent years, the building has been extensively renovated as a combination downtown central business district office building and high tech telecommunications facility. As of 2010, the bank lobby is being leased to a formal event catering company, who uses the facility for banquets and wedding receptions.

In 1980, when the Downtown Albany Historic District was listed on the National Register of Historic Places, the building was included as a contributing property.

As of 2010, the Home Savings bank building was owned by New York City-based Heights Real Estate Company.

Gallery

See also
List of tallest buildings in Albany, New York

References

External links 

 
Skyscraperpage building page

Skyscrapers in Albany, New York
Art Deco architecture in New York (state)
Art Deco skyscrapers
Office buildings completed in 1927
Historic district contributing properties in New York (state)
National Register of Historic Places in Albany, New York
Office buildings on the National Register of Historic Places in New York (state)
Skyscraper office buildings in New York (state)
1927 establishments in New York (state)